Michel Saykali (12 June 1932 – 7 May 2015) was a Lebanese fencer. He competed in the individual and team épée events at the 1960 and 1964 Summer Olympics.

References

External links
 

1932 births
2015 deaths
Lebanese male épée fencers
Olympic fencers of Lebanon
Fencers at the 1960 Summer Olympics
Fencers at the 1964 Summer Olympics
People from Sidon